International Series Gold (previously known as the Championship Series) was a series of professional tennis tournaments held internationally between 2000 and 2008 that were part of the ATP Tour. The tournaments were positioned below the ATP Masters Series, and above the ATP International Series in terms of prize money and ranking points available.

International Series Gold tournaments offered players cash prizes (purses from $755,000 to $1,426,250 as of 2008) and the ability to earn ATP ranking points. See Association of Tennis Professionals#Rankings for more details.

Effective in 2009, this series of tournaments became the ATP Tour 500, incorporating many of the same tournaments. The "500" represents the number of ATP ranking points earned by the winner of each event in the series.

Tournaments
The locations and titles of these tournaments may change from year to year. The tournaments, in calendar order, are:

Singles champions

ATP International Series Gold

ATP Championship Series

Doubles champions

International Series Gold

ATP Championship Series

Titles champions 2000 to 2008

Players with 3 or more titles

 RO = Rotterdam, ME = Memphis, DU = Dubai, AC = Acapulco (Mexico City), BA = Barcelona, ST = Stuttgart, KI = Kitzbühel, TO = Tokyo, PA = Paris, EX = Extinct tournaments.

 The 4th International Series Gold tournament was played in Mexico City in 2000, before moving to its current location in Acapulco in 2001.

 The "Extinct tournaments" are: Indianapolis, Washington, London.

 Active players in bold. 3 or more titles per tournament underlined.

Titles champions 1990 to 1999
Players with 3 or more titles

Note
Prior to the formation of the ATP in 1990 three of these tournaments Philadelphia, Indianapolis, and Tokyo were part of the Grand Prix Super Series major ranking tournaments. The precursor to Masters 1000 Series Events.

See also
ATP International Series
List of tennis tournaments

External links
 Association of Tennis Professionals (ATP) official website

ca:International Series Gold
de:ATP 500 Series
es:ATP Open 500
fr:International Series Gold
hu:ATP International Series Gold
sv:ATP 500 Series